Elisabeth, Countess of Neuchâtel or Isabelle de Neuchâtel (died 25 December 1395) was ruling countess de jure of the County of Neuchâtel from 1373 until 1395. She was the daughter of Louis I of Neuchâtel and Jeanne de Montfaucon and married Rodolphe IV de Nidau.

References
 Annales historiques du Comté de Neuchâtel et Valangin depuis Jules-César jusqu'en 1722, Jonas Boyve, édition E. Mathey, 1854, p. 365 à 397. Google livres

1395 deaths
14th-century women rulers
Counts of Neuchâtel